Cori Rashel Close (born July 29, 1971) is the current head women's basketball coach for the UCLA Bruins. She was hired by the Bruins in 2011. Before UCLA, she spent time as an assistant coach at Florida State University and her alma mater, UC Santa Barbara. She was a star player for the UCSB Gauchos as she served as a team captain during the 1992 and 1993 seasons while leading them to the NCAA Tournament in each of those years.

UC Santa Barbara statistics

Source

Head coaching record

Awards and honors
March 23, 2016 – Close was named the 2016 United States Marine Corps/WBCA NCAA Division I Region 5 Coach of the Year
March 6, 2019 – Close voted Pac-12 Coach of the Year by Pac-12 women’s basketball media members

References 

1971 births
Living people
American women's basketball coaches
Basketball coaches from California
Florida State Seminoles women's basketball coaches
People from Milpitas, California
Sportspeople from Santa Clara County, California
UCLA Bruins women's basketball coaches
UC Santa Barbara Gauchos women's basketball coaches
UC Santa Barbara Gauchos women's basketball players